In finance, a T-forward measure is a pricing measure absolutely continuous with respect to a risk-neutral measure, but rather than using the money market as numeraire, it uses a bond with maturity T. The use of the forward measure was pioneered by Farshid Jamshidian (1987), and later used as a means of calculating the price of options on bonds.

Mathematical definition 

Let

 

be the bank account or money market account numeraire and

 

be the discount factor in the market at time 0 for maturity T.  If  is the risk neutral measure, then the forward measure  is defined via the Radon–Nikodym derivative given by

Note that this implies that the forward measure and the risk neutral measure coincide when interest rates are deterministic.  Also, this is a particular form of the change of numeraire formula by changing the numeraire from the money market or bank account B(t) to a T-maturity bond P(t,T). Indeed, if in general

is the price of a zero coupon bond at time t for maturity T, where  is the filtration denoting market information at time t, then we can write

from which it is indeed clear that the forward T measure is associated to the T-maturity zero coupon bond as numeraire. For a more detailed discussion see Brigo and Mercurio (2001).

Consequences 

The name "forward measure" comes from the fact that under the forward measure, forward prices are martingales, a fact first observed by Geman (1989) (who is responsible for formally defining the measure).  Compare with futures prices, which are martingales under the risk neutral measure.  Note that when interest rates are deterministic, this implies that forward prices and futures prices are the same.

For example, the discounted stock price is a martingale under the risk-neutral measure:

Thus, we have 

by using the Radon-Nikodym derivative  and the equality .  The last term is equal to unity by definition of the bond price so that we get

References

See also

Risk-neutral measure
Forward price

Finance theories
Mathematical finance
Martingale theory